Mohammad Anwar Afzal (born 1926) is an Afghan former footballer, who competed at the 1948 Summer Olympic Games.

References

External links
 
 

1926 births
Possibly living people
Afghan men's footballers
Olympic footballers of Afghanistan
Footballers at the 1948 Summer Olympics
Association football forwards